The Chiang Mai Initiative (CMI) is a multilateral currency swap arrangement among the ten members of the Association of Southeast Asian Nations (ASEAN), the People's Republic of China (including Hong Kong), Japan, and South Korea. It draws from a foreign exchange reserves pool worth US$120 billion and was launched on 24 March 2010.  That pool has been expanded to $240 billion in 2012.

The initiative began as a series of bilateral swap arrangements after the ASEAN Plus Three countries met on 6 May 2000 in Chiang Mai, Thailand, at an annual meeting of the Asian Development Bank. After 1997 Asian Financial Crisis, member countries started this initiative to manage regional short-term liquidity problems and to avoid relying on the International Monetary Fund.

History

Conception 

At the height of the 1997 Asian Financial Crisis, Japanese authorities proposed an Asian Monetary Fund, which would serve as a regional version of the International Monetary Fund (IMF). However, this idea was shelved after encountering strong resistance from the United States. After the crisis, finance ministers of members of the Association of Southeast Asian Nations (ASEAN), the People's Republic of China, Japan, and South Korea met on 6 May 2000 at the 33rd Annual Meeting of the Board of Governors of the Asian Development Bank (ADB) in Chiang Mai, Thailand, to discuss the establishment of a network of bilateral currency swap agreements. The proposal was dubbed the Chiang Mai Initiative and intended to avoid a future recurrence of the Asian Financial Crisis. It also implied the possibility of establishing a pool of foreign exchange reserves accessible by participating central banks to fight currency speculation. The proposal would also supplement the financial resources of international institutions such as the IMF. Joint Ministerial Statement (JMS) was issued after the ASEAN+3 Finance Minister’s Meetings have mentioned the development of the CMI.

Early critics questioned the reasoning behind the initiative. The Asia Times Online wrote in an editorial published several days after the meeting, "The idea that the existence of a currency swap arrangement or the wider concept of an Asian monetary fund [...] could have prevented the Asian crisis or the worst of it, is both wrong and politically noxious." After IMF Managing Director Horst Köhler visited five Asian nations, including Thailand, in June 2000, the Asia Times Online denounced his endorsement of "the ill-conceived and likely never to be implemented Asean plus three [...] currency-swap plan". In a 2001 interview with the Far Eastern Economic Review, Köhler stated that the CMI would promote regional economic co-operation and development and that he would not oppose the formation of an Asian Monetary Union.

Expansion 
As of 16 October 2009, the network consisted of 16 bilateral arrangements among the ASEAN Plus Three countries worth approximately US$90 billion. Additionally, the ASEAN Swap Arrangement had a reserves pool of approximately US$2 billion.

Multilateralisation 
In May 2007, at the 10th meeting of ASEAN+3 Finance Ministers the CMI further progress was agreed upon.

Foundation of CMI was meant to expand bilateral swaps of ASEAN. In addition, it was to aid the existing financial facilities of IMF. Nonetheless, the Global Financial Crisis proved that the CMI was not working up to its expectation and was in need of further development. Instead of seeking for CMI liquidity provision, Korea and Singapore used the US Federal Reserve as their way of securing liquidity, and Indonesia sought support from China and Japan.  Consequently, policy-makers realised that the CMI needed a reserve pooling arrangement and took action to multilateralise the initiative. Hence, the Chiang Mai Initiative Multilateralisation (CMIM) Agreement was founded in 2009.

In February 2009, ASEAN+3 agreed to expand the fund to $120 billion up from the original level of $78 billion proposed in 2008.

During the April 2009 meeting of ASEAN finance ministers in Pattaya, Thailand, the individual contributions to be made by each member state toward the reserves pool were announced. Each of the six original ASEAN members—Indonesia, Malaysia, Singapore, the Philippines, and Thailand—agreed to contribute US$4.77 billion, while each of the remaining four members would contribute between US$30 million and US$1 billion. The ten countries were scheduled to meet their partners following the finance ministers' meeting, but the summit's cancellation due to the Thai political crisis delayed the launch of the multilateral agreement to a later date. When leaders of the thirteen countries finally met in Bali in May, they finalised the individual contributions of China, Japan, and South Korea. This summit also added Hong Kong as a new participant, whose contribution was added to that of China though Hong Kong remained "a monetary administration on its own". Its participation raised China's total contribution to US$38.4 billion, equal to that of Japan, and South Korea, which agreed to contribute US$19.2 billion. China and Japan remain the biggest contributors, each contributing 32 percent of total financial contributions. Including Korea, these three countries account for 80 percent of all the contributions made to CMIM while the remaining 20 percent is from ASEAN countries.

On 3 May 2012, 15th ASEAN+3 Finance Ministers and Central Bank’s Governors’ meeting was held in Manila, Philippines which made an agreement about expanding CMIM from current $120 billion to 240 billion. The ASEAN+3 also agreed to adopt the CMIM Precautionary Line (CMIM-PL), which is designed on the model of PPL program within the IMF to prevent the financial crisis. In addition, IMF de-linked portion is raised from 20 percent to 30 percent and with its future goal of reaching 40 in the year 2014. Regarding the expanded funding of CMIM, countries now can receive up to $30 billion.

The Chiang Mai Initiative Multilateralisation (CMIM) Agreement was signed on 28 December 2009, and took effect on 24 March 2010.

Participants 
Bloomberg estimated that participants of the Chiang Mai Initiative held more than US$4.1 trillion of foreign exchange reserves in 2009.

Notes

ASEAN

People's Republic of China 
China holds the world's largest foreign exchange reserves, which reached US$1 trillion in November 2006. The figure doubled in the second quarter of 2009 and had risen by almost 14 times within the past decade. According to a Deutsche Bank official, "China's reserves will allow the [United States] to run a higher fiscal deficit than other nations". This deficit was caused by the US government's additional spending in an effort to revive the economy from a recession. The reserves reached US$2.27 trillion in September 2009, and the country's sovereign wealth fund—the China Investment Corporation—had become more aggressive in its foreign investments.

Japan 
Japan possesses the second largest foreign exchange reserves. It became the second country to reach US$1 trillion in reserves in February 2008. In contrast to China, which places "stringent" control on its currency, the Japanese government has not placed any control on the yen since 2004. The reserves reached US$1.06 trillion in October 2009.

South Korea 
South Korea ranked sixth in foreign exchange reserves, which reached US$270.9 billion in November 2009. It accounted for 6.4 percent of the total ASEAN Plus Three reserves and 8 percent of the combined gross domestic product of the participating countries in 2009. The Korea Times wrote in an editorial that the country should act as a mediator between China and Japan, whose equal contributions meant that both "should refrain from racing for regional hegemony in the cooperative grouping".

Further reading
 Grimes, William W., The Asian Monetary Fund Reborn? Implications of Chiang Mai Initiative Multilateralization (Asia Policy, January 2011)
 Lipscy, Phillip Y., Japan's Asian Monetary Fund Proposal (Stanford Journal of East Asian Affairs, Spring 2003)

See also 
 Comprehensive Economic Partnership for East Asia
 Asian Monetary Unit

Notes

References

External links 
 Regional Financial Cooperation among ASEAN+3

ASEAN laws
Chiang Mai
Foreign exchange market
2006 in law
2006 in Asia
2006 in Thailand